The Hlinka Gretzky Cup is an annual international under-18 ice hockey tournament administered by Hockey Canada, the Czech Ice Hockey Association, and the Slovak Ice Hockey Federation.

Held since 1991, it has been contested under various titles and in various countries, including Japan, Mexico, and Canada. From 1997 through 2017, hosting duties for the event alternated between, and were later split between, the Czech Republic and Slovakia. During this period, the event was known as the Nations Cup, the U-18 Junior World Cup, and Ivan Hlinka Memorial Tournament. From 2018 through 2023, the tournament will alternate between Edmonton/Red Deer, Alberta and Břeclav, Czech Republic/Piešťany, Slovakia.

The event is not sanctioned by the International Ice Hockey Federation (IIHF), which holds its own U18 championship in April. As that event conflicts with playoffs within the Canadian Hockey League (CHL), the Hlinka Gretzky Cup is one of the few opportunities for Canada to compete with its strongest U-18 national team. Canada has subsequently been the most dominant team in the tournament, having won 22 times.

The tournament is a prominent pre-season showcase for National Hockey League (NHL) prospects; 17 players on Canada's winning team from 2017 were selected with first-round picks in the 2018 NHL Entry Draft.

History
The tournament started in 1991, hosted by Japan for the first three years, as well as the fifth. In its first year, it was known as the Phoenix Cup, after which the Pacific Cup moniker was adopted (with the exception of 1994, when Mexico served as the host country and the tournament was known as La Copa Mexico). In 1996, the tournament was first held in Canada. Beginning in 1997, four years after the dissolution of Czechoslovakia, the Czech Republic and Slovakia began alternating as hosts, and the tournament was renamed the Nations Cup. The two countries alternated until 2003, then co-hosted from 2003 through 2017. At this time, it was also renamed the U-18 Junior World Cup. In 2007, the event was renamed the Ivan Hlinka Memorial Tournament in honour of prominent Czech player Ivan Hlinka—who had died in a vehicle accident in 2004.

Historically, the tournament has been dominated by Canada; over 29 years, the country has won 22 times and medalled in each year except 2003, 2007, 2016 and 2021. As the IIHF's official U18 world championships conflicts with playoffs in domestic competitions such as the Canadian Hockey League (CHL), this tournament is the only competition of the two to which Canada is able to send its best under-18 team.

In January 2018, Hockey Canada announced that the 2018 edition would be co-hosted by Edmonton and Red Deer, Alberta, in association with Oilers Entertainment Group and the Czech and Slovak ice hockey federations, and that the event had been renamed the Hlinka Gretzky Cup—additionally honouring Edmonton Oilers hall of famer Wayne Gretzky. The tournament will alternate between Edmonton/Red Deer and Břeclav/Piešťany annually through 2022. The 2020 tournament was cancelled due to the COVID-19 pandemic, while Canada did not participate in the 2021 tournament—with Germany replacing them. It was announced that this hosting cycle would be extended through 2023. Due to the 2022 World Junior Championships being rescheduled for August in Edmonton shortly after the event, the 2022 Hlinka Gretzky Cup was played exclusively in Red Deer.

Results

Medal leaders

References

External links
History from Hockey Canada

 
Ice hockey tournaments
International ice hockey competitions for junior teams
Ice hockey events